A number of steamships have been named Tharros, including:

, a Greek cargo ship in service 1950–51
, a British cargo ship in service during 1950

Ship names